Shekal Gurab or Shakalgurab, also rendered as Shaghal Gurab or Shigal Gurab or Shikil-Kirab,  may refer to:
 Shekal Gurab-e Bala
 Shekal Gurab-e Pain